Daniel Ntongi-Nzinga (born 1946) is a peace activist and Christian leader in Angola.

Ntoni-Nzinga studied at the University of Leeds before co-founding the Grupo Angolan de Reflexao para Paz (GARP), and the Inter-Ecclesiastical Committee for Peace in Angola (COIEPA) in April 2000, organizations advocating an end to the Angolan Civil War (1975-2002). He previously served as the Executive Secretary of the Evangelical Baptist church in Angola and as Secretary General of the Angolan Council of Churches.

References

1946 births
Angolan clergy
Angolan politicians
Angolan Baptists
Angolan evangelicals
Alumni of the University of Leeds
Living people